Edgar Jay Sherman (November 28, 1834 – June 9, 1914) was an American attorney who served as District Attorney of the Eastern District of Massachusetts, as a  member of the Massachusetts House of Representatives, Attorney General of Massachusetts and as an associate justice of the Massachusetts Superior Court.

Early life
Sherman was born November 28, 1834 in Weathersfield, Vermont to David and Fanny (Kendall) Sherman.

Death
Sherman died June 9, 1914 in Windsor, Vermont.

References

1834 births
1914 deaths
Massachusetts Attorneys General
People from Weathersfield, Vermont
People from Windsor, Vermont
Politicians from Lawrence, Massachusetts
People of Massachusetts in the American Civil War
Republican Party members of the Massachusetts House of Representatives
19th-century American politicians